Trent Rowing Club is a rowing club on the River Trent, based at The Boathouse, Stapenhill Road, Burton upon Trent, Staffordshire.

Club colours
The blade colours are royal blue with a white chevron; kit: royal blue with white crest or 2 diagonal hoops.

History
The club was possibly founded as early as 1859 with a recorded participation in a regatta. The amateur status dates back to 1863. The boathouse sits next door to rival club Burton Leander Rowing Club.

The club is affiliated to British Rowing and has produced several British champions.

Honours

British champions

References

Sport in Staffordshire
Sport in Burton upon Trent
Rowing clubs in England
Rowing clubs of the River Trent
Burton upon Trent